FC Sher Bishkek was a Kyrgyzstani football club based in Bishkek, Kyrgyzstan that played in the top division in Kyrgyzstan, the Kyrgyzstan League.  The club played its home games at Dynamo Stadion.

History 
2002: Founded as FC Sher Bishkek.
2006: Renamed to FC Sher-Ak-Dan Bishkek.
2007: Renamed to FC Sher Bishkek.
2011: Dissolved.

External links 
Career stats by KLISF

Football clubs in Kyrgyzstan
Football clubs in Bishkek
2002 establishments in Kyrgyzstan
2011 disestablishments in Kyrgyzstan